Playa Grande Airport  is an airstrip serving the town of Playa Grande in the Quiché Department of Guatemala.

See also
 
 
 Transport in Guatemala
 List of airports in Guatemala

References

External links
 OurAirports - Playa Grande
 FallingRain - Playa Grande
 OpenStreetMap - Playa Grande
 

Airports in Guatemala
Quiché Department